The following is an alphabetical list of articles related to the U.S. state of Florida.

0–9

.fl.us – Internet second-level domain for the state of Florida
1st Florida Cavalry
1st Florida Cavalry Regiment (Union)
1st Florida Infantry
1st Florida Special Cavalry Battalion
2nd Florida Cavalry Regiment (Union)
2nd Florida Infantry
3rd Florida Infantry
5th Florida Infantry
7th Florida Infantry
8th Florida Infantry
11th Florida Infantry
25th parallel north
26th parallel north
27th parallel north
27th state to join the United States of America
28th parallel north
29th parallel north
30th parallel north
31st parallel north, forms part of Florida's border with Alabama.
81st meridian west
82nd meridian west
83rd meridian west
84th meridian west
85th meridian west
86th meridian west
87th meridian west

A
Abortion in Florida
Acosta Bridge
Adams-Onís Treaty of 1819
Adamsville, Hillsborough County, Florida
Adjacent states:

African Cemetery at Higgs Beach
Agriculture in Florida
Airports in Florida
Alachua County, Florida
Alachua County Library District
Alachua County Sheriff's Office
Alafia, Florida
Alafia River State Park
Alapaha River
Albert Whitted Airport
Altha, Florida
Amelia Island State Park
Amusement parks in Florida
commons:Category:Amusement parks in Florida
Anastasia State Park
Anna Maria, Florida
Anna Maria Island
Antioch, Florida
Apalachicola Bay
Apalachicola, Florida
Apalachicola Regional Airport
Apalachicola River
Apollo Beach, Florida
Aquaria in Florida
commons:Category:Aquaria in Florida
Arboreta in Florida
commons:Category:Arboreta in Florida
Arcadia, Florida
Arcadia Municipal Airport
Archaeology in Florida
:Category:Archaeological sites in Florida
commons:Category:Archaeological sites in Florida
Architecture in Florida
Area codes in Florida
Arlington (Jacksonville)
Armenia Gardens Estates
Art museums and galleries in Florida
commons:Category:Art museums and galleries in Florida
Astatula, Florida
Astor Bridge
Astronomical observatories in Florida
Atlantic Beach, Florida
Attorney General of the State of Florida
Auburndale, Florida
Audubon Park (Tampa)
Aucilla River
Avalon State Park
Aventura, Florida
Avon Park, Florida
Ax Handle Saturday
Azalea Park, Florida

B
Bahama Village
Bahia Honda State Park
Bahia Honda Rail Bridge
Baker County, Florida
Baker County Sheriff's Office (Florida)
Baker's Haulover Inlet
Bald Point State Park
Bal Harbour, Florida
Ballast Point (Tampa)
Balm, Florida
Banana River
Barber–Mizell feud
Barge Port (Palatka, Florida)
Bartow Executive Airport
Battle of Ballast Point
Battle of Fort Brooke
Battle of Fort Myers
Battle of Gainesville
Battle of Lake Okeechobee
Battle of Marianna
Battle of Natural Bridge
Battle of Ocheesee
Battle of Olustee
Battle of Ouithlacoochie
Battle of Pensacola (1861)
Battle of Pine Island Ridge
Battle of Saint Johns Bluff
Battle of San Felasco Hammock
Battle of Santa Rosa Island
Battle of St. Johns Bluff
Battle of Vernon
Battle of Wahoo Swamp
Battles of the Loxahatchee
Bayard (Jacksonville)
Bay County Courthouse (Florida)
Bay County, Florida
Bay Crest Park, Florida
Bay Harbor Islands, Florida
Bay Hill, Florida
Bay Lake, Florida
Bay of Pigs Monument
Bay of Pigs Museum
Bayshore Beautiful
Bayshore Gardens, Florida
Bayshore Gardens (Tampa)
Bayside West
Beaches of Florida
commons:Category:Beaches of Florida
Beach Park (Tampa)
Beach Park Isles
Bealsville, Florida
Beasley (Tampa)
Bee Ridge, Florida
Belleair, Florida
Belleair Beach, Florida
Belleair Bluffs, Florida
Belleair Shore, Florida
Belle Glade, Florida
Belle Glade State Municipal Airport
Belle Isle, Florida
Belleview, Florida
Bell, Florida
Bel Mar Shores
Belmont Heights (Tampa)
Bert Dosh Memorial Bridge
Beverly Beach, Florida
Bicycle trails in Florida
Big Bend Power Station
Big Lagoon State Park
Big Shoals State Park
Big Talbot Island State Park
Bill Baggs Cape Florida State Park
Biscayne Bay
Biscayne National Park
Bithlo, Florida
Blackburn Point Bridge
Blackwater River (Florida)
Blackwater River State Park
Blind Pass
Bloomingdale, Florida
Blountstown, Florida
Blue Spring State Park
Boca Grande Causeway
Boca Raton, Florida
Boca Raton Airport
Bok Tower Gardens
Bon Air (Tampa)
Bonita Beach Causeway
Bonita Springs, Florida
Botanical gardens in Florida
commons:Category:Botanical gardens in Florida
Bowling Green, Florida
Bowman Heights
Boyette, Florida
Boyton Beach, Florida
Braden River
Bradenton, Florida
Bradenton Beach, Florida
Bradford County, Florida
Brandon, Florida
Brevard County, Florida
Brevard County Library System
Brickell
Brickell Avenue
Brickell Avenue Bridge
Brickell station
Bridge of Lions
Bristol, Florida
Broadway Bridge (Daytona Beach)
Brooklyn (Jacksonville)
Brooksville–Tampa Bay Regional Airport
Broward County, Florida
Broward County Library
Broward County Sheriff's Office
Buckman Bridge
Buenaventura Lakes, Florida
Buildings and structures in Florida
commons:Category:Buildings and structures in Florida

 Bulow Creek State Park
 Bulow Plantation Ruins Historic State Park
 Bunnell, Florida

C

Caladesi Island State Park
Calhoun County Airport (Florida)
Calhoun County, Florida
Caloosahatchee Bridge
Caloosahatchee River
Camp Helen State Park
Canaveral National Seashore
Cannabis in Florida
Cape Coral Bridge
Capital of the State of Florida
Capitol of the State of Florida
commons:Category:Florida State Capitol
Captiva Pass
Card Sound Bridge
la Caroline, 1564–1565
Carrabelle, Florida
Carrabelle River
Carrollwood (CDP), Florida
Castillo de San Marcos
Caves of Florida
commons:Category:Caves of Florida
Caxambas Pass
Cayo Costa State Park
Cecil Airport
Cedar Key, Florida
Census statistical areas of Florida
Channel District
Charlotte County, Florida
Chassahowitzka National Wildlife Refuge
Chassahowitzka River
Chattahoochee, Florida
Chattahoochee River
Cheval, Florida
Chiefland, Florida
Chipola River
Choctaw Sea, ancient Florida
Chotctawhatchee Bay
Chotctawhatchee River
Christmas, Florida
Citrus County, Florida
Citrus Park, Florida
Citrus County Sheriff's Office
Clarcona, Florida
Clay County Courthouse (Florida)
Clay County, Florida
Clearwater, Florida
Clearwater Memorial Causeway
Clermont, Florida
Clewiston, Florida
Cities in Florida
commons:Category:Cities in Florida
Climate of Florida
:Category:Climate of Florida
commons:Category:Climate of Florida
Climate change in Florida 
Colleges and universities in Florida
commons:Category:Universities and colleges in Florida
Collier County, Florida
Collier County Public Library
Collier-Seminole State Park
Collins Avenue
Colony of East Florida, 1763–1783
Colony of West Florida, 1763–1783
Colt Creek State Park
Columbia County Courthouse (Florida)
Columbia County, Florida
Communications in Florida
commons:Category:Communications in Florida
Companies in Florida
:Category:Companies based in Florida
Congressional districts of Florida
Congress of French Culture in Florida
Constitution of the State of Florida
Convention centers in Florida
commons:Category:Convention centers in Florida
Convention Center station (Jacksonville)
Conway, Florida
Coral Gables, Florida
Cortez, Florida
Coral Springs Covered Bridge
Coral Springs Fire Department
Coral Springs, Florida
Cory Lake Isles
Counties of the state of Florida
commons:Category:Counties in Florida
County roads in Florida
Courtney Campbell Causeway
COVID-19 pandemic in Florida
Crocodile Lake National Wildlife Refuge
Cross City Airport
Crystal River Airport
Crystal River Energy Complex
Crystal River (Florida)
Crystal River Preserve State Park
Culbreath Bayou
Culbreath Isles
Culture of Florida
commons:Category:Florida culture
Floribbean cuisine

 Curry Hammock State Park
 Curtis Hixon Waterfront Park
 Cutler Bay, Florida
 Cypress Lake, Florida

D
Dade Battlefield Historic State Park
Dade massacre
Dames Point Bridge
Dania Beach, Florida
Davenport, Florida
Davie, Florida
Daytona Beach Bandshell
Daytona Beach Boardwalk
Daytona Beach, Florida
Daytona Beach International Airport
Daytona Beach Police Department
Debary, Florida
Deerfield Beach, Florida
Deer Lake State Park
DeFuniak Springs Airport
DeLand, Florida
DeLand Municipal Airport
De Leon Springs State Park
Delnor-Wiggins Pass State Park
Delray Beach, Florida

 Deltona, Florida

 Demographics of Florida
 :Category:Demographics of Florida

DeSoto County Courthouse (Florida)
DeSoto County, Florida
Desoto Lakes, Florida
De Soto National Memorial
DeSoto Next Generation Solar Energy Center
Destin–Fort Walton Beach Airport
Devil's Millhopper Geological State Park
Dixie County, Florida
Doctor Phillips, Florida
Don Pedro Island State Park
Doral, Florida
Dover, Florida
Downtown Jacksonville
Downtown Tampa
Dr. Von D. Mizell-Eula Johnson State Park
Dry Tortugas National Park
Dunedin, Florida
Dunnellon, Florida
Dunns Creek State Park
Duval County Courthouse
Duval County, Florida

E
Eagle Lake, Florida
Eagle Lake (Florida)
East Bay (Santa Rosa County, Florida)
East Lake-Orient Park, Florida
Eatonville, Florida
Eau Gallie Causeway
Eau Gallie River
Ecology Party of Florida
Econfina River
Econfina River State Park
Econlockhatchee River
Economy of Florida
:Category:Economy of Florida
commons:Category:Economy of Florida
Eden Gardens State Park
Edgeville, Florida
Education in Brevard County, Florida
Education in Florida
:Category:Education in Florida
commons:Category:Education in Florida
Education in Jacksonville, Florida
Edison Bridge (Florida)
Edward Ball Wakulla Springs State Park
Egmont Key State Park and National Wildlife Refuge
Egypt Lake, Florida
Egypt Lake-Leto, Florida
Elections in the state of Florida
:Category:Florida elections
commons:Category:Florida elections
Ellenton, Florida
El Portal, Florida
Emergency Medical Services Alliance
Environment of Florida
:Category:Environment of Florida
commons:Category:Environment of Florida

 Escambia Bay
 Escambia Bay Bridge
 Escambia County, Florida
 Escambia County Sheriff's Office (Florida)
 Estero Bay (Florida)
 Eustis, Florida
 Everglades City, Florida
 Everglades Forever Act
 Everglades National Park

F

Fairview Shores, Florida
Falling Waters State Park
Fanning Springs, Florida
Fanning Springs State Park
Faver-Dykes State Park
Fellesmere, Florida
Fern Cliff
Ferndale, Florida
Fern Park, Florida
Fernandina Beach Municipal Airport
Festivals in Florida
commons:Category:Festivals in Florida
Fish Hawk, Florida
FL – United States Postal Service postal code for the state of Florida
Flag of the state of Florida
Flagler Beach, Florida
Flagler County, Florida
Flagler County Airport
Florence Villa
Florida  website
:Category:Florida
commons:Category:Florida
commons:Category:Maps of Florida
Florida Administrative Code
Florida Administrative Register
Florida Air National Guard
Florida Aquarium
Florida Army National Guard
Florida bankruptcy law
Florida Bay
Florida Blue Key
Florida Board of Accountancy
Florida Board of Control
Florida Board of Education
Florida Board of Governors
Florida Board of Regents
Florida Caverns State Park
Florida Central Voter File
Florida Certified Organic Growers
Florida circuit courts
Florida Citrus Mutual
Florida City, Florida
Florida Civil Rights Hall of Fame
Florida cracker
Florida Democratic League
Florida Democratic Party
Florida Department of Agriculture and Consumer Services
Florida Department of Air and Water Pollution Control
Florida Department of Business and Professional Regulation
Florida Department of Children and Families
Florida Department of Citrus
Florida Department of Corrections
Florida Department of Education
Florida Department of Environmental Protection
Florida Department of Environmental Regulation
Florida Department of Health
Florida Department of Highway Safety and Motor Vehicles
Florida Department of Law Enforcement
Florida Department of Management Services
Florida Department of Military Affairs
Florida Department of Revenue
Florida Department of Transportation
Florida Department of Veterans Affairs
Florida Distance Learning Consortium
Florida Distance Library Learning Initiative
Florida District Courts of Appeal
Florida Division of Alcoholic Beverages and Tobacco
Florida Division of Emergency Management
Florida Division of Vocational Rehabilitation
Florida Fifth District Court of Appeal
Florida Film Critics Circle
Florida First District Court of Appeal
Florida Fish and Wildlife Conservation Commission
Florida Forensic League
Florida Fourth District Court of Appeal
Florida High School Athletic Association
Florida High Tech Corridor Council
Florida Highway Patrol
Florida Holocaust Museum
Florida House of Representatives
Florida in the American Civil War, 1861–1865
The Florida Interurban Railway and Tunnel Company
Florida Judicial Nominating Commission
Florida Keys Council of the Arts
Florida Legislative Investigation Committee
Florida Library Association
Florida Man
Florida Media Quarterly
Florida Medicaid waiver
Florida Mental Health Act
Florida Military School
Florida Municipal Electric Association
Florida Museum of Photographic Arts
Florida Music Education Association
Florida National Guard
Florida Naval Militia
The Florida Network of Youth and Family Services
Florida Occidental, 1783–1821
Florida Oriental, 1783–1821
Florida Ornithological Society
Florida Philosophical Association
Florida Power & Light
Florida property law
Florida Public Archaeology Network
Florida Public Relations Association
Florida Registry of Interpreters for the Deaf
Florida Rural Broadband Alliance
Florida Russian Lifestyle Magazine
Florida Scholastic Press Association
Florida Second District Court of Appeal
Florida Senate
Florida Sheriffs Association
Florida Slavery Memorial
Florida Small Business Development Center Network
Florida State Capitol
Florida State Courts System
Florida State Guard
Florida State University
Florida State University College of Arts and Sciences
Florida State University College of Business
Florida State University College of Communication and Information
Florida State University College of Criminology and Criminal Justice
Florida State University College of Education
Florida State University College of Fine Arts
Florida State University College of Human Sciences
Florida State University College of Law
Florida State University College of Medicine
Florida State University College of Motion Pictures Arts
Florida State University College of Music
Florida State University College of Nursing
Florida State University College of Social Sciences
Florida State University School of Information
Florida Student Association
Florida Surface Water Improvement and Management Act of 1987
Florida Teacher Certification Examinations
Florida Third District Court of Appeal
Florida Virtual School
Florida Whig Party
Floridaland
Forest Hills (Tampa)
Fort Barrancas
Fort Clinch State Park
Fort Cooper State Park
Fort George Island Cultural State Park
Fort Lauderdale Fire-Rescue Department
Fort Lauderdale, Florida
Fort Lauderdale–Hollywood International Airport
Fort Lonesome, Florida
Fort Matanzas National Monument
Fort Meade, Florida
Fort Myers, Florida
Fort Myers Police Department
Fort Myers Power Plant
Fort Pickens
Fort Pierce Inlet State Park
Forts in Florida
Fort de la Caroline, first French colony 1564-1565
:Category:Forts in Florida
commons:Category:Forts in Florida

Fort Walton Beach Airport
Fort White, Florida
Fort Zachary Taylor Historic State Park
Four Corners, Florida
Franklin County, Florida
Fred Gannon Rocky Bayou State Park
Frostproof, Florida
Fruitland Park, Florida
Fruitville, Florida
Fuller Warren Bridge

G

Garden City (Jacksonville)
Gardens in Florida
commons:Category:Gardens in Florida
Gadsden County, Florida
Gadsden County Public Library System
Gainesville, Florida
Gainesville metropolitan area, Florida
Gainesville Police Department
Gainesville Regional Airport
Gandy Bridge
Gandy-Sun Bay South
Gasparilla Island State Park
Gasparilla Pass
Geneva, Florida
Geography of Florida
:Category:Geography of Florida
commons:Category:Geography of Florida
Geology of Florida
commons:Category:Geology of Florida
George Crady Bridge Fishing Pier
George E. Turner Power Plant
George Floyd protests in Florida
Ghost towns in Florida
:Category:Ghost towns in Florida
commons:Category:Ghost towns in Florida
Gibsonton, Florida
Gilchrist County Courthouse
Gilchrist County, Florida
Ginnie Springs
Glades County Courthouse
Glades County, Florida
Glazer Children's Museum
Glen St. Mary, Florida
Golden Beach, Florida
Goldenrod, Florida
Gotha, Florida
Golf clubs and courses in Florida
Golf View
Government of the state of Florida  website
:Category:Government of Florida
commons:Category:Government of Florida
Governor of the State of Florida
List of governors of Florida
Granada Bridge (Ormond Beach)
Grant Park (Tampa)
Gray Gables (Tampa)
Grayton Beach State Park
Greater Orlando
Great White Heron National Wildlife Refuge
Great Seal of the State of Florida
Green Cove Springs, Florida
Green Party of Florida
Greensboro, Florida
Greenville, Florida
Gretna, Florida
Groveland, Florida
Groveland Four
Gun laws in Florida
Gulf City, Florida
Gulf County, Florida
Gulfport, Florida

H
Haines City, Florida
Halifax River
Hallandale Beach, Florida
Hallandale Beach Police Department
Hamilton County, Florida
Hampton, Florida
Hampton Terrace Historic District
Harbour Island (Tampa)
Hardee County Courthouse
Hardee County, Florida
Harry S. Truman Little White House
Harvey Heights (Tampa)
Hathaway Bridge
Havana, Florida
Henderson Beach State Park
Hendry Country, Florida
Herbert Hoover Dike
Herlong Recreational Airport
Hernando County Courthouse
Hernando County, Florida
Hernando County Library System
Homestead, Florida
Florida's Hazelhurst terrace and shoreline
Heritage railroads in Florida
commons:Category:Heritage railroads in Florida
Hialeah, Florida
Hialeah Gardens, Florida
Hialeah Police Department
High schools of Florida
Higher education in Florida
Highlands County Courthouse
Highlands County, Florida
Highlands Hammock State Park
Highlands Pines
Highway Patrol of Florida
Highways in Florida
Hiking trails in Florida
commons:Category:Hiking trails in Florida
Hillsboro Inlet
Hillsborough County, Florida
Hillsborough County Sheriff's Office (Florida)
Hillsborough River State Park
Historic Hyde Park North
Historic Seaport
History of Bartow, Florida
History of Florida
Historical outline of Florida
:Category:History of Florida
commons:Category:History of Florida
History of Fort Lauderdale, Florida
History of Gainesville, Florida
History of Jacksonville, Florida
History of Pensacola, Florida
History of Sarasota, Florida
History of slavery in Florida
History of St. Augustine, Florida
History of Tallahassee, Florida
History of Tampa, Florida
History of West Palm Beach, Florida
History of Ybor City
Holden Heights, Florida
Hollywood, Florida
Hollywood Police Department (Florida)
Holmes Beach, Florida
Holmes County, Florida
Homosassa River
Homosassa Springs Wildlife State Park
Homesexuality and Citizenship in Florida
Honeymoon Island State Park
Hontoon Dead River
Hontoon Island State Park
Hopewell, Hillsborough County, Florida
Hopewell Gardens, Florida
Horizon West, Florida
Hospitals in Florida
Hot springs of Florida
commons:Category:Hot springs of Florida
House Bill H-837
Howey-in-the-Hills, Florida
Hugh Taylor Birch State Park
Hunter's Creek, Florida
Hunters Green
Hyde Park (Tampa)

I
Ichetucknee River
Ichetucknee Springs State Park
Images of Florida
commons:Category:Florida
Immokalee Regional Airport
Imperial River (Florida)
Incarceration in Florida
Independence Party of Florida
Indian Creek, Florida
Indian River County, Florida
Indian River County Library System
Indian River (Florida)
Indian River Shores, Florida
Indian Rocks Beach, Florida
Indian Shores, Florida
Indiantown, Florida
Indigenous people of the Everglades region
Inglis, Florida
Interbay (Tampa)
Interstate highway routes in Florida
Inverness, Florida
Iona, Florida
Islamorada, Florida
Islands of Florida

J
Jackson County Courthouse (Florida)
Jackson County, Florida
Jackson Heights (Tampa)
Jacksonville, Florida
Jacksonville Beach, Florida
Jacksonville International Airport
Jacksonville metropolitan area
Jacksonville Public Library
Jacksonville Sheriff's Office
Jacksonville Skyway
Jacksonville Transportation Authority
Jacob City, Florida
Jasper, Florida
James Weldon Johnson Park
James Weldon Johnson Park station
JEA
JEA Northside Generating Station
Jefferson County, Florida
Jerfferson County Courthouse (Florida)
Jefferson station (Jacksonville)
Jewfish Creek Bridge
Jewish Museum of Florida
Jim Jumper massacre
Jim Woodruff Dam
John D. MacArthur Beach State Park
John Pennekamp Coral Reef State Park
John Ringling Causeway
Jonathan Dickinson State Park
Jupiter Island, Florida

K
Kennedy Space Center
Kenneth City, Florida
Key Colony Beach, Florida
Keystone, Florida
Keystone Heights Airport
Keystone Heights, Florida
Keysville, Florida
Key West
Key West International Airport
Key West National Wildlife Refuge
Key West Police Department
Kilcrease Light Artillery
King's Road (Florida)
Kissimmee, Florida
Knights, Florida

L
La Caroline, first French colony 1564-1565
Lady Lake, Florida
Lafayette Blue Springs State Park
Lafayette County Courthouse (Florida)
Lafayette County, Florida
La Florida, 1565–1763
Largo, Florida
Lakes of Florida
commons:Category:Lakes of Florida
LaBelle, Florida
LaBelle Municipal Airport
Lake Alfred, Florida
Lake Buena Vista, Florida
Lake Butler, Florida
Lake City, Florida
Lake City Gateway Airport
Lake Clarke Shores, Florida
Lake County, Florida
Lake County Sheriff's Office (Florida)
LaCrosse, Florida
Lake Fern, Florida
Lake Griffin State Park
Lake Hamilton, Florida
Lake Hart, Florida
Lake Helen, Florida
Lake June in Winter Scrub State Park
Lake Kathryn, Florida
Lake Kissimmee State Park
Lakeland, Florida
Lake Louisa State Park
Lake Magdalene, Florida
Lake Manatee State Park
Lake Mary, Florida
Lake Placid, Florida
LaVilla
Lake Wales Municipal Airport
Lakewood Ranch, Florida
Lake Worth Inlet
Lake Worth Lagoon
Landmarks in Florida
commons:Category:Landmarks in Florida
Languages of Florida
Laurel, Florida
Laws of the state of Florida
Lawtey, Florida
Layton, Florida
League of Women Voters of Florida
Lee County, Florida
Lee County Sheriff's Office (Florida)
Lee, Florida
Leesburg, Florida
Leesburg International Airport
Lehigh Acres, Florida
Leon County, Florida
Leto, Florida
Levy County Courthouse
Levy County, Florida
LGBT culture in Miami
LGBT history in Florida
LGBT rights in Florida
Lockhart, Florida
Longboat Key, Florida
Lower Suwannee National Wildlife Refuge
Libertarian Party of Florida
Lieutenant Governor of the State of Florida
Lists related to the state of Florida:
List of African-American newspapers in Florida
List of airports in Florida
List of Cape Canaveral and Merritt Island launch sites
List of bicycle trails in Florida
List of breweries in Florida
List of casinos in Florida
List of census statistical areas in Florida
List of cities in Florida
List of colleges and universities in Florida
List of companies in Florida
List of United States congressional districts in Florida
List of counties in Florida
List of forts in Florida
List of ghost towns in Florida
List of governors of Florida
List of colonial governors of Florida
List of high schools in Florida
List of hospitals in Florida
List of individuals executed in Florida
List of Interstate highway routes in Florida
List of islands of Florida
List of law enforcement agencies in Florida
List of lieutenant governors of Florida
List of museums in Florida
List of National Historic Landmarks in Florida
List of newspapers in Florida
List of people from Florida
List of places in Florida
List of radio stations in Florida
List of railroads in Florida
National Register of Historic Places listings in Florida
List of rivers of Florida
List of school districts in Florida
List of shipwrecks of Florida
List of sister cities in Florida
List of state forests in Florida
List of state parks in Florida
List of state prisons in Florida
List of State Roads in Florida
List of state symbols of Florida
List of telephone area codes in Florida
List of television stations in Florida
List of toll roads in Florida
List of United States congressional delegations from Florida
List of United States congressional districts in Florida
List of United States representatives from Florida
List of United States senators from Florida
List of University of Miami alumni
List of U.S. highway routes in Florida

 Lithia, Florida
 Little Econlockhatchee River
 Little Manatee River
 Little Manatee River State Park
 Little Talbot Island State Park
 Little Wekiva River
 Live Oaks Square
 Long Key Bridge
 Long Key State Park
 Lovers Key State Park
 Lowry Park Central
 Lowry Park North
 Lutz, Florida

M
MacArthur Causeway
Macclenny, Florida
Macfarlane Park, Tampa
Madeira Beach, Florida
Madison Blue Spring State Park
Madison County Courthouse (Florida)
Madison County, Florida
Madison, Florida
Main Street Bridge (Jacksonville)
Maitland, Florida
Manasota Key, Florida
Manatee County Courthouse
Manatee County, Florida
Manatee River
Manatee Springs State Park
Mandarin (Jacksonville)
Mango, Florida
Maps of Florida
commons:Category:Maps of Florida
Marathon, Florida
Marchman Act
Marco Island Airport
Marco Island, Florida
Marianna Municipal Airport
Marina Club
Marineland, Florida
Marion County, Florida
Marion County Public Library System
Maritime history of Florida
Martin County, Florida
Martin Next Generation Solar Energy Center
Maryland Manor
Mascotte, Florida
Matanzas Inlet
Matanzas Pass Bridge
Matanzas River
Mayport (Jacksonville)
McIntosh, Florida
Medley, Florida
Media in Jacksonville, Florida
Media in Key West, Florida
Media in Miami
Media in the Tampa Bay area
Melbourne Causeway
Memorial Park (Jacksonville)
Merrill P. Barber Bridge
Merritt Island Airport
Merritt Island Causeway
Metromover
Metropolitan Park
Metrorail (Miami-Dade County)
Miami Avenue
Miami Avenue station
Miami Fire-Rescue Department
Miami, Florida
Miami Beach, Florida
Miami Beach Police Department
Miami-Dade County Courthouse
Miami-Dade County, Florida
Miami-Dade Fire Rescue Department
Miami-Dade Police Department
Miami-Dade Public Library System
Miami Intermodal Center
Miami International Airport
Miami Lakes, Florida
Miami metropolitan area
MIA Mover
Miami Police Department
Miami River (Florida)
Miami Shores, Florida
Mid-Bay Bridge
Midpoint Memorial Bridge
Midway, Seminole County, Florida
Mike Roess Gold Head Branch State Park
Minneola, Florida
Miramar, Florida
Miramar Police Department
M. K. B. v. Warden
Monroe County, Florida
Monroe County Public Library (Florida Keys)
Montverde, Florida
Monuments and memorials in Florida
commons:Category:Monuments and memorials in Florida
Moore Haven, Florida
Mulberry, Florida
Museums in Florida
:Category:Museums in Florida
commons:Category:Museums in Florida
Music of Florida
:Category:Music of Florida
commons:Category:Music of Florida

 Myakka River
 Myakka River State Park

N
Naples, Florida
Naples Police Department
Nassau County Courthouse (Florida)
Nassau County, Florida
Nassau County Sheriff's Office (Florida)
National Forests of Florida
commons:Category:National Forests of Florida
Natural arches of Florida
commons:Category:Natural arches of Florida
Natural Bridge Battlefield Historic State Park
Natural history of Florida
commons:Category:Natural history of Florida
Nature centers in Florida
commons:Category:Nature centers in Florida
Negro Fort
New River Public Library Cooperative
New Smyrna Beach, Florida
New Smyrna Beach Municipal Airport
News media in Florida
Newspapers of Florida
Neptune Beach, Florida
New River Tunnel
New Suburb Beautiful
New Town (Jacksonville)
Nokomis, Florida
Northdale, Florida
Northeast Florida Regional Airport
North Fort Myers, Florida
North Ruskin, Florida
Northside (Jacksonville)
North Tampa
North Tampa (neighborhood)
North Miami, Florida
North Miami Beach, Florida
North Palm Beach County General Aviation Airport
North Peninsula State Park
North Perry Airport
North Redington Beach, Florida
North Sarasota, Florida
Northwest Florida Beaches International Airport
Nowatney, Florida

O
Oakland, Florida
Oakland Park, Florida
Oaklead Plantation, Florida
Ocala, Florida
Ocala International Airport
Ocala National Forest
Ocean Breeze, Florida
Ocean Ridge, Florida
Oceanway (Jacksonville)
Ochlockonee River State Park
Ocklawaha River
Ocoee massacre
Ocolee, Florida
Okeechobean Sea
Okeechobee Battlefield
Okeechobee County Airport
Okeechobee County Courthouse
Okeechobee County, Florida
Okeechobee Waterway
Okefenokee Swamp
Old Baker County Courthouse
Old Bradford County Courthouse
Old Brevard County Courthouse
Old Calhoun County Courthouse
Old Charlotte County Courthouse
Old Citrus County Courthouse
Old Flagler County Courthouse
Old Gulf County Courthouse
Old Hendry County Courthouse
Old Hillsborough County Courthouse
Old Indian River County Courthouse
Old Lake County Courthouse (Florida)
Old Lee County Courthouse
Old Manatee County Courthouse
Old Martin County Courthouse
Old Orange County Courthouse (Florida)
Old Pinellas County Courthouse
Old Polk County Courthouse (Florida)
Oldsmar, Florida
Old Wakulla County Courthouse
Oleta River
Oleta River State Park
O'Leno State Park
Oneco, Florida
Opa-locka, Florida
Orange County Courthouse (Florida)
Orange County Fire Rescue
Orange County, Florida
Orange County Library System
Orange County Sheriff's Office (Florida)
Orange Island
Orange River (Florida)
Orange Park, Florida
Orchid, Florida
Orient Park, Florida
Orlando Fire Department
Orlando, Florida
Orlando City Soccer Club
Orlando City Stadium
Orlando International Airport
Melbourne Orlando International Airport
Orlando Museum of Art
Orlando Police Department
Orlando Sanford International Airport
Orlando Science Center
Ortega (Jacksonville)
Oscar Scherer State Park
Osceola County Courthouse (Florida)
Osceola County, Florida
Osceola Library System
Osceola National Forest
Osceola County Sheriff's Office
Osprey, Florida
Osteen Bridge
Otter Creek, Florida
Outdoor sculptures in Florida
commons:Category:Outdoor sculptures in Florida

P
Page Field
Paisley, Florida
Palatka Municipal Airport
Palm Bay (Florida)
Palm Beach County, Florida
Palm Beach County Library System
Palm Beach, Florida
Palm Beach Gardens, Florida
Palm Beach International Airport
Palm Beach Police Department
Palm Beach County Fire Rescue
Palm Beach County Sheriff's Office
Palm Coast, Florida
Palma Sola, Florida
Palmetto Beach
Palmetto, Florida
Palm River, Florida
Palm Springs, Florida
Panama City–Bay County International Airport, a former airport in Panama City.
Panama City Beach, Florida
Panama City, Florida
Parker, Florida
Parkland Estates
Pasco County Courthouse
Pasco County, Florida
Pasco County Sheriff's Office
Pasco–Hernando State College
Pebble Creek, Florida
Pembroke Pines, Florida
Penney Farms, Florida
Pensacola/Santa María de Ochuse, capital of British Colony of West Florida 1763–1783, capital of the Spanish colony of Florida Occidental 1783-1821
Pensacola Bay
Pensacola International Airport
Pensacola Metropolitan Area
Pensacola Police Department
Pensacola State College
Pensacola streetcar strike of 1908
People from Florida
:Category:People from Florida
commons:Category:People from Florida
:Category:People by city in Florida
:Category:People by county in Florida
:Category:People from Florida by occupation
Perdido Bay
Perdido Key State Park
Perry–Foley Airport
Perry race riot
Pinellas County, Florida
Pinellas County Sheriff's Office
Pinellas Park, Florida
Places in Florida
Plantation, Florida
Plant City Airport
Politics of Florida
:Category:Politics of Florida
commons:Category:Politics of Florida
Polk City, Florida
Polk County, Florida
Polk State College
Ponce de Leon Bay
Ponce de Leon Inlet
Ponce de Leon Springs State Park
Populated places in Florida
Cities in Florida
Towns in Florida
Villages in Florida
Census Designated Places in Florida
Other unincorporated communities in Florida
List of ghost towns in Florida
List of places in Florida
Port Mayaca Lock and Dam
Port Miami Tunnel
Port Orange Causeway
Port Orange, Florida
Port St. Joe, Florida
Port Sutton, Florida
Port Tampa (neighborhood)
Progress Village, Florida
Protected areas of Florida
commons:Category:Protected areas of Florida

 Punta Gorda Airport (Florida)
 Pulse Memorial and Museum
 Putnam County Courthouse (Florida)
 Putnam County, Florida

Q

 Quincy, Florida

R
Radio stations in Florida
Railroad museums in Florida
commons:Category:Railroad museums in Florida
Railroads in Florida
Rainbow River
Rainbow Springs State Park
Rattlesnake (Tampa)
Reddick, Florida
Redfish Pass
Redington Beach, Florida
Redington Shores, Florida
Registered historic places in Florida
commons:Category:Registered Historic Places in Florida
Religion in Florida
:Category:Religion in Florida
Rembrandt Gardens
Republican Party of Florida
Ribault River
Ridgewood Park (Tampa)
Ritz Theatre (Jacksonville)
Riverbend (Tampa)
Rivercrest
River Grove (Tampa)
Rivers of Florida
commons:Category:Rivers of Florida
Riverside and Avondale
Riverside Heights
Riverside Park (Jacksonville)
Riverview, Florida
Roads in Florida
Robles Park
Rockledge, Florida
Rocky Creek, Florida
Roller coasters in Florida
commons:Category:Roller coasters in Florida

 Roman Catholic Archdiocese of Miami
 Roman Catholic Diocese of Orlando
 Roman Catholic Diocese of Palm Beach
 Roman Catholic Diocese of Pensacola–Tallahassee
 Roman Catholic Diocese of Saint Petersburg
 Roman Catholic Diocese of St. Augustine
 Roman Catholic Diocese of Venice in Florida
Roosevelt Bridge (Florida)
 Rosewood massacre
 Rotonda West, Florida
 Ruskin, Florida

S
Safety Harbor, Florida
Saint Augustine Blues
Same-sex marriage in Florida
Samoset, Florida
San Agustín/Saint Augustine, capital of Spanish Florida 1565–1763, capital of British  Colony of East Florida 1763–1783, capital of Spanish Florida Oriental 1783-1821
Sanford, Florida
Sanford Police Department (Florida)
Sanibel Causeway
San Marco (Jacksonville)
Santa Fe College
Santa Fe River (Florida)
Santa Fe Swamp
San Marcos de Apalache Historic State Park
Santa María de Ochuse/Pensacola, capital of British Colony of West Florida 1763–1783, capital of the Spanish colony of Florida Occidental 1783-1821
Santa Rosa County, Florida
Santa Rosa County Sheriff's Office
Sarasota Bay
Sarasota–Bradenton International Airport
Sarasota County Courthouse
Sarasota County, Florida
Sarasota County Sheriff's Office
Sarasota, Florida
Sarasota Police Department
School districts of Florida
Scouting in Florida
Sebastian, Florida
Sebastian Inlet
Sebastian Inlet Bridge
Sebastian Inlet State Park
Sebastian Municipal Airport
Sebring, Florida
Sebring Regional Airport
Seffner, Florida
Seminole, Florida
Seminole County Fire Department
Seminole County, Florida
Seminole County Public Library System
Seminole County Sheriff's Office (Florida)
Seminole Heights
Seminole State College of Florida
Seminole Wars
commons:Category:Sports in Florida
Seven Mile Bridge
Sewall's Point, Florida
Shands Bridge
Shark River (Florida)
Silver Springs State Park
Sister cities in Florida
Skirmish at Cedar Creek
Skirmish of the Brick Church
Skyway Fishing Pier State Park
Socialist Party of Florida
Soho (Tampa)
Sopchoppy River
South Beach
South Bradenton, Florida
Southernmost House
South Florida Regional Transportation Authority
South Florida State College
Southgate, Florida
South Gate Ridge, Florida
South Lakeland Airport
South Lake Worth Inlet
South Nebraska
South Pasadena, Florida
Southern Pines (Tampa)
South Sarasota, Florida
South Seminole Heights
Southeast Seminole Heights
South Tampa
South Venice, Florida
Southwest Florida International Airport
South Westshore
Sports in Florida
:Category:Sports in Florida
commons:Category:Sports in Florida
:Category:Sports venues in Florida
commons:Category:Sports venues in Florida
Springfield, Florida
Springfield (Jacksonville)
S.S. Jolley Bridge
Starke, Florida
State Capitol of Florida
State of Florida  website
Constitution of the State of Florida
Government of the state of Florida
:Category:Government of Florida
commons:Category:Government of Florida
Executive branch of the government of the State of Florida
Governor of the State of Florida
Legislative branch of the government of the State of Florida
Legislature of the State of Florida
Senate of the State of Florida
House of Representatives of the State of Florida
Judicial branch of the government of the State of Florida
Supreme Court of the State of Florida
State College of Florida, Manatee–Sarasota
State parks of Florida
commons:Category:State parks of Florida
State prisons of Florida
State roads in Florida
St. Andrews Bay (Florida)
St. Andrews State Park
St. Augustine, Florida
St. Augustine Foot Soldiers Monument
St. Cloud, Florida
Steinhatchee River
Stephen Foster Folk Culture Center State Park
St. George Island State Park
St. Johns County, Florida
St Johns County Public Library System
St. Johns River State College
St. Joseph Bay
St. Lucie County, Florida
St. Lucie County Library System
St. Lucie Inlet, Florida
St. Lucie Nuclear Power Plant
Stoney Point (Tampa)
St. Pete Beach, Florida
St. Pete–Clearwater International Airport
St. Petersburg College
St. Petersburg Fire Rescue
St. Petersburg, Florida
St. Petersburg, Florida riots of 1996
St. Petersburg Police Department
St. Petersburg sanitation strike of 1968
Structures in Florida
Stuart, Florida
Stump Pass Beach State Park
Sulphur Springs (Tampa)
Sumter County Courthouse (Florida)
Sumter County, Florida
Sumter County Library System
Sumter County Sheriff's Office (Florida)
Sun City Center, Florida
Sunset Park (Tampa)
Supreme Court of the State of Florida
Suwannee County Airport
Suwannee County Courthouse
Suwannee County, Florida
Suwannee River
Suwannee River State Park
Swann Estates
Sweetwater Creek, Florida
Sydney, Florida
Symbols of the state of Florida
:Category:Symbols of Florida
commons:Category:Symbols of Florida

T
Tallahassee Community College
Tallahassee Fire Department
Tallahassee, Florida, territorial and state capital since 1824
Tallahassee metropolitan area
Tallahassee International Airport
Tallahassee Police Department
Tallevast, Florida
Tallulah-North Shore
Tampa Bay
Tampa Bay Area
Tampa Bay Automobile Museum
Tampa Bay History Center
Tampa Bypass Canal
Tampa cigar makers' strike of 1931
Tampa Fire Rescue Department
Tampa, Florida
Tampa Heights
Tampa–Hillsborough County Public Library System
Tampa International Airport
Tampa Museum of Art
Tampa Overlook
Tampa Palms
Tampa Police Department
Tampa Union Station
Tarpon Springs, Florida
Tavares, Florida
Taylor County, Florida
TECO Energy
TECO Line Streetcar
Telecommunications in Florida
commons:Category:Communications in Florida
Telephone area codes in Florida
Television shows set in Florida
Television stations in Florida
Temple Crest
Temple Terrace, Florida
Terra Ceia, Florida
Terrace Park (Tampa)
Territory of Florida, 1822–1845
Theatres in Florida
commons:Category:Theatres in Florida
Thonotosassa, Florida
Three Rivers State Park
T.H. Stone Memorial St. Joseph Peninsula State Park
Timeline of Fort Lauderdale, Florida
Timeline of Hialeah, Florida
Timeline of Jacksonville, Florida
Timeline of Largo, Florida history
Timeline of Miami
Timeline of Orlando, Florida
Timeline of St. Petersburg, Florida
Timeline of Tampa, Florida
Timeline of Tallahassee, Florida
Titusville, Florida
Titusville Police Department
Toll roads in Florida
Tomoka River
Tomoka State Park
Torreya State Park
Tourism in Florida  website
commons:Category:Tourism in Florida
Town 'n' Country, Florida
Trail of Tears, 1830–1838
Transportation in Florida
:Category:Transportation in Florida
commons:Category:Transport in Florida

 Transportation in South Florida
 Treasure Coast International Airport
Treasure Island, Florida
Trenton, Florida
Tri-Rail
Trout River (Florida)
Troy Spring State Park
Truman Annex
Turkey Creek, Florida
Turkey Point Nuclear Generating Station

U
Uceta Yard
Umatilla, Florida
Union County, Florida
United States Customs House and Post Office (Pensacola, Florida)
United States of America
States of the United States of America
United States census statistical areas of Florida
United States congressional delegations from Florida
United States congressional districts in Florida
United States Court of Appeals for the Eleventh Circuit
United States District Court for the Middle District of Florida
United States District Court for the Northern District of Florida
United States District Court for the Southern District of Florida
United States representatives from Florida
United States senators from Florida
Universal Orlando Resort
Universities and colleges in Florida
commons:Category:Universities and colleges in Florida
University, Hillsborough County, Florida
University of Central Florida
University of Central Florida College of Arts and Humanities
University of Central Florida College of Business Administration
University of Central Florida College of Dental Medicine
University of Central Florida College of Engineering and Computer Science
University of Central Florida College of Medicine
University of Central Florida College of Nursing
University of Central Florida College of Optics and Photonics
University of Central Florida College of Sciences
University of Florida
University of Florida College of Agricultural and Life Sciences
University of Florida College of Dentistry
University of Florida College of Engineering
University of Florida College of Liberal Arts and Sciences
University of Florida College of Medicine
University of Florida College of Nursing
University of Miami
University of North Florida
University of South Florida
University of Tampa
Uptown Tampa
US-FL – ISO 3166-2:US region code for the State of Florida

V

 Valencia College
 Valparaiso, Florida
Valrico, Florida
Vamo, Florida
Vehicle registration plates of Florida
Venetian Causeway
 Venice, Florida
Venice Gardens, Florida
Venice Municipal Airport
 Vernon, Florida
 Vero Beach, Florida
Vero Beach Regional Airport
Victory Bridge (Florida)
 Village of the Arts, Bradenton, Florida
 Virginia Park (Tampa)
Volusia County, Florida
Volusia County Public Library
V.M. Ybor

W
Wabasso Bridge
Wakulla County, Florida
Walt Disney World
Walton County Courthouse (Florida)
Walton County, Florida
Washington County Courthouse (Florida)
Washington County, Florida
Water parks in Florida
commons:Category:Water parks in Florida

Wauchula Municipal Airport
Wedgefield, Florida
Weeki Wachee Springs
Wekiwa Springs State Park
Wellswood
Werner-Boyce Salt Springs State Park
Wes Skiles Peacock Springs State Park
West Bradenton, Florida
Westchase, Florida
West County Energy Center
West Hyde Park
West Meadows
West Palm Beach, Florida
West Palm Beach Police Department
West Park, Florida
West Riverfront
West Samoset, Florida
Westshore Palms
Westshore (Tampa)
West Tampa
 Weston, Florida
 Wewahitchka, Florida
 Whitewater Bay
Whitfield, Manatee County, Florida
Williamsburg, Florida
Williston, Florida
Williston Municipal Airport
Wilton Manors, Florida
Wimauma, Florida
Windermere, Florida
Windley Key Fossil Reef Geological State Park
Wikimedia
Wikimedia Commons:Category:Florida
commons:Category:Maps of Florida
Wikinews:Category:Florida
Wikinews:Portal:Florida
Wikipedia Category:Florida
Wikipedia Portal:Florida
Wikipedia:WikiProject Florida
:Category:WikiProject Florida articles
:Category:WikiProject Florida members

X

Y

 Yankeetown, Florida
 Ybor City
 Ybor City Museum State Park
 Yellow Bluff Fort Historic State Park
 Yulee Sugar Mill Ruins Historic State Park

Z
Zellwood, Florida
Zephyrhills Municipal Airport
Zolfo Springs, Florida
Zoos in Florida
commons:Category:Zoos in Florida

See also

Topic overview:
Florida
Outline of Florida

Florida
 
Florida